DWR may stand for:

Businesses and organisations
 California Department of Water Resources, a department of the California Natural Resources Agency
 Duke of Wellington's Regiment, a former regiment of the British Army
 Design Within Reach, a retail subsidiary of American furniture maker Herman Miller (manufacturer)

People
 D. W. Robertson Jr. (1914–1992), American medieval literature scholar

Technology
 Direct Web Remoting, a Java open source library
 Durable water repellent, a type of fabric coating